is a station on the Yurikamome Line in Kōtō, Tokyo, Japan. It is numbered "U-11".

Station layout
The station consists of an elevated island platform.

Platforms

History
The station opened on 1 November 1995, with the name . On 16 March 2019, it was renamed to its current name.

Surrounding area
Tokyo Big Sight

References

External links
Official information site

Railway stations in Tokyo
Yurikamome
Railway stations in Japan opened in 1995